Vishnulokam is a 1991 Indian Malayalam-language romantic drama film directed by Kamal, written by T. A. Razzaq, and produced by Sanal Kumar and G. Suresh Kumar. The film stars Mohanlal, Shanthi Krishna, Urvashi, and Murali. The songs featured in the film was composed by Raveendran, while Johnson provided the background score.

Plot

Govindan Aashaan, Kumari Kasthuri, Tharakan and Bheemarajan reach a village as part of their street circus troupe but their main performer Sankunni reach there only later. Sankunni sees Savithrikutty and fall in love but Evil Landlord Prathapa Varma has an eye on Savithrikutty. Sankunni asks Savithrikutty not to surrender before Prathapa Varma. He asked Savithri to come along with him. But Savithri did not agree with this. Prathapa Varma's people beat Govindan Aashaan and others. So they decided to go to some other place. Sankunni saw Savithri Kutty and asked her to come along with him to some other place. Prathapa Varma's people beat Sankunni and kidnaps Savithrikutty. Sankunni reached Prathapa Varma's house and tried to kill Prathapa Varma. At last he took Savithri Kutty along with him.

Cast

Mohanlal as Sankunni
Shanthi Krishna as Savithri
Urvashi as Kasthoori
Murali as Prathapa Varma Thampuran
Balan K. Nair as Govindan Aashaan
Sukumari as Vilasini
Nedumudi Venu as Krishnanunni
Oduvil Unnikrishnan as Achuthan
Santhosh
Maniyanpilla Raju
Krishnankutty Nair
Aranmula Ponnamma
Kaithapram
Bobby Kottarakkara as Bheemarajan
Jagadish as Tharakan
Kaveri
Nayana
Shyama
Soorya

Production
Vishnulokam was the debut film of Dileep who worked as assistant director. Initially, producer G. Suresh Kumar's wife and actress Menaka was decided in the role of Savithri and had 20 days work charted, but she opted out due to difficulty in managing her baby daughter (Revathy) and work at the same time. Later, Shanthi Krishna was cast in the role.

Soundtrack 
The music was composed by Raveendran and the lyrics were written by Kaithapram Damodaran. A version of the famous Mukesh song "Awaara Hoon", composed by Shankar Jaikishan and written by Hasrat Jaipuri was also used in the film. This version was crooned by actor Mohanlal. The songs "Mindaathathenthe" and "Kasthoori Ente Kasthoori" is quite popular still today among Kerala audiences.

References

External links
 

1991 films
1990s Malayalam-language films
Films shot in Palakkad
Films directed by Kamal (director)
Films scored by Raveendran